K. Srilata (also known as Srilata Krishnan) is an Indian poet, fiction writer, translator and academic based in Chennai. Her poem, In Santa Cruz, Diagnosed Home Sick won the First Prize in the All India Poetry Competition (organized by the British Council and The Poetry Society (India)) in 1998. She has also been awarded the Unisun British Council Poetry Award (2007) and the Charles Wallace fellowship for a writing residency (2010). Her debut novel Table for Four was long-listed in 2009 for the Man Asian Literary Prize and released in 2011.

Career
Her first book of poems, Seablue Child, was published in 2000, followed by Arriving Shortly (2011). Other poetry collections are Writing Octopus (2013) and Bookmarking the Oasis (2015).  She also translated from Tamil to English two millennia worth of poetry titled Rapids of a Great River: The Penguin Book of Tamil Poetry - along with Lakshmi Holmstrom and Subashree Krishnaswamy. Her other work includes a translation of R. Vatsala's Tamil novel Once there was a girl (Vattathul) and a translation of women's writing from the Self-Respect Movement The Other Half of the Coconut: Women Writing Self-Respect History. Yoda Press has published an Indo-Irish collaborative poetry anthology All the Worlds Between that she co-edited with Fiona Bolger. Srilata has been a writer-in-residence at the University of Stirling, at Sangam House and at the Yeonhui Art Space in Seoul. She was a Fulbright pre-doctoral scholar at the University of California, Santa Cruz. She co-curates the CMI Arts Initiative along with Madhavan Mukund and K.V. Subrahmanyam, apart from hosting a writing residency in partnership with Sangam House. Srilata is also part of the team that runs Yavanika Press, an e-publishing site specializing in poetry.

She is also a professor at the Indian Institute of Technology, Madras where she teaches Creative Writing, Fiction, Advanced English and Translation Studies. She is adjunct professor at the Chennai Mathematical Institute.

Bibliography

Poetry

Collections
Bookmarking the Oasis, Mumbai: Paperwall/Poetrywala, 2015, 
Writing Octopus, New Delhi: Authorspress, 2013, 
Arriving Shortly, Kolkata: Writers Workshop, 2011, 
Seablue Child, the Brown Critique, Kolkata, 2002.

Featured in
 The Dance of the Peacock: An Anthology of English Poetry from India (2013) ed. by Dr Vivekanand Jha and published by Hidden Brook Press, Canada. 
"For [Jeanne Mukuninwa]", "What father left us", and "Gomati",The Harper Collins Book of English Poetry (ed. [Sudeep Sen]), India, 2013, 
Another Country: An Anthology of Post-Independence Poetry in English, (ed. [Arundhathi Subramaniam]), Sahitya Akademi, New Delhi, 2013, 
"England, 1999", "A Somewhat Different Question", and "I Wear Wordlessness like a Tattered Dress", Caravan, February 2013, 
"Poem Walk", Kavya Bharati, 2011, No. 23
"Drunken, Gasping Fish-lungs", "Mining", and "Slow Trot", Muse India, Issue 63 
"A Brief History of Writing", and "Gravity", Prairie Schooner 87, no. 2, 2013 
"Mazhai/Rain", Sonic Boom, Issue 3, 2014

Fiction

Novels
Table for Four, New Delhi: Penguin, 2011,

Stories
"You Expert Woman, You", Guftugu, May 2017
"Mynah Hands, Flying Fingers", The Punch Magazine, April 2017
"Rainbow Loom Bracelet", Out of Print, September 2015
"Cousin, Newly Acquired", Madras Mag, October 2014
"These Things Happen if You Don't Watch it", Volume 28, Issue 3, Wasafiri, 2013
"Game of Asylum Seekers", Breaking the Bow: Speculative Fiction Inspired by the Ramayana (edited by Anil Menon and Vandana Singh), Zubaan, 2012, 
"Sarasu", the Little Magazine, Vol. 5, Issue 4, 2004; First Impressions: Stories and Plays Shortlisted for the TLM New Writing Award, 2006 (the Little Magazine, New Delhi, 2006), Other People: The Sangam House Reader Vol. I, Sangam House 2011
"State of Whiteness", The Shrinking Woman and Other Stories, Bangalore: Unisun, 2009
"How Do I Love Thee?: Let Me Count the Ways", The Penguin Book of New Writing From India 2: First Proofs, New Delhi: Penguin, 2006

Translations
The Rapids of a Great River: The Penguin Book of Tamil Poetry Penguin Book of Tamil Poetry (co-edited with Lakshmi Holmstrom and Subashree Krishnaswamy), New Delhi: Penguin India, 2009.
Once There Was a Girl (translation of the Tamil novel Vattathul by R.Vatsala), Kolkata: Writers Workshop,2012,

Academic/Editing
The Other Half of the Coconut: Women Writing Self-Respect History, New Delhi: Zubaan, 2003, 
Short Fiction from South India, (co-edited with Subashree Krishnaswamy), New Delhi: OUP, 2008,

References

Sources
  Eighth National Poetry Competition 1998 - Award Winners
K Srilata - An Interview
Selected Poetry of K Srilata
  India Writes - Contemporary Indian Poetry
Poems by K Srilata on Recours au Poeme
"Terra Nullius" on Recours au Poeme
"Dreaming Mostly of Nameless Things" on Origami Poems
"Dreaming, Mostly of Nameless Things" on YouTube
"Somewhere a Skylight" on Origami Poems
"Not in the Picture" and "A Big Elephant in My Room"
K Srilata - Poetry at Sangam House
"Boxes have that Effect" at Right Hand Pointing
K Srilata - Poetry International Web
Taut and Crisp on The Hindu Verse Reviews
Penning Verse on The Hindu
K Srilata - Poemhunter.com
"A Disappeared Person", "Boundaries", "Behind me, a Slow, Full Moon" and "Slender" on Brown Critique

1968 births
Living people
Indian women poets
Writers from Chennai
Indian women short story writers
21st-century Indian translators
20th-century Indian translators
21st-century Indian women writers
21st-century Indian writers
English-language poets from India
20th-century Indian women writers
21st-century Indian poets
21st-century Indian short story writers
People from Ranchi
Women writers from Uttarakhand
Indian women translators
All India Poetry Prize
Indian translators